Easterine Kire is a poet and author who currently lives in northern Norway. The majority of her writings are based in the lived realities of the people in Nagaland in north-east India. Her motivation to write is summed up in this statement by her in an interview, "I felt we needed to create written Naga Literature. We have so much oral narratives but with oral dying out, it's all going to be lost." Apart from writing, she also performs Jazz poetry with her band Jazzpoesi.

Early life 
Easterine Kire was born on 29 March 1959 in Kohima to an Angami Naga family from Kohima Village. She did her schooling in Baptist English School. She then went to pursue her undergraduate study in Shillong followed by a course in journalism in Delhi. She has a phD in English literature from Savitribai Phule Pune University.

Books 

Easterine Kire published her first book of poetry in 1982 titled "Kelhoukevira". This was also the first book of Naga poetry published in English. Her novel "A Naga Village Remembered" published in 2003  was the first novel by a Naga writer in English. Her second novel was "A Terrible Matriarchy" (2007) followed by "Mari" (2010), "Bitter Wormwood" (2011) and "Don't Run, My Love" (2017). Her latest book "Walking the Roadless Road: Exploring the Tribes of Nagaland" was published in 2019. She has also written children's books, articles and essays. Her first children's book in English was published in 2011. Kire has also translated 200 oral poems from her native language.

"A Naga Village Remembered" is about a battle between the British forces and one Naga hamlet. "A Terrible Matriarchy" highlights the internal and social strife that grips Nagaland as a state in India. "Mari" is a novel based on the Japanese invasion of India in 1944 via Nagaland. It is a true story of a young mother who lost her fiancé in the war and made the decision to move ahead and live her life. This is an example of how Kire through her works has tried to bring to the fore the everyday lives of the people in Nagaland. "Bitter Wormwood", yet again brought out the human cost (effect on human lives) which was involved behind all the news that made the political headlines from the North-East.

Apart from bringing a focus on the vibrant Naga culture, Kire's work has also brought out the realities which have changed the lives of Naga women.

Awards and recognitions 

Easterin Kire's  "Son of  the  Thundercloud"  has  been awarded Bal  Sahitya  Puraskar by Sahitya  Academy in 2018. In 2011, Easterine Kire was awarded the Governor's Medal for excellence in Naga literature. She was also awarded the Free Voice Award by Catalan PEN Barcelona. "Bitter Wormwood" was shortlisted for The Hindu Prize in 2013.

"A Terrible Matriarchy" was selected to be translated into UN languages. Furthermore, the books "A Terrible Matriarchy", "Mari", "Forest Song", "Naga Folktales Retold" and "A Naga Village Remembered"  have been translated into German.
In 2015, her "When the River Sleeps" was awarded The Hindu Literary Prize.

References

External links 

1959 births
Living people
Savitribai Phule Pune University alumni
People from Kohima
Naga people